This is a list of Cypriot First Division's top goalscorers by season since 1960.

Top goalscorers by season

Top goalscorers by club
This is a list of the Cypriot First Division top goalscorers by club since 1960.

Sources
Cyprus – List of Topscorers

Cyprus
    

Association football player non-biographical articles